Petra Fontanive (born 10 October 1988) is a Swiss athlete specialising in the 400 metres hurdles. She represented her country at the 2015 World Championships in Beijing and 2017 World Championships in London reaching the semifinals on both occasions. Fontanive also participated in 2016 Summer Olympics in Rio de Janeiro, where she finished sixth in her heat and did not advance to the semifinal. Her personal best in the event is 54.56 seconds set in Geneva in 2017.

International competitions

References

External links

Official site (in German)

1988 births
Living people
Swiss female hurdlers
World Athletics Championships athletes for Switzerland
Place of birth missing (living people)
Athletes (track and field) at the 2016 Summer Olympics
Olympic athletes of Switzerland